Chie Akutsu (born 15 September 1984) is a Japanese field hockey player. At the 2012 Summer Olympics she competed with the Japan women's national field hockey team in the women's tournament.

References

External links
 

Living people
1984 births
Field hockey players at the 2012 Summer Olympics
Olympic field hockey players of Japan
Japanese female field hockey players